Jean-Pierre Pernot (born 25 June 1947) is a French politician.

Pernot was born in Clichy-sous-Bois on 25 June 1947. He was first elected mayor of Méry-sur-Oise in 1995, while affiliated with the Socialist Party. Pernot later joined the Citizen and Republican Movement. The Constitutional Council froze Pernot's campaign accounts in a 2013 ruling, rending him unable to run in the 2014 election. He served on the National Assembly as a Socialist Party member representing Val-d'Oise's 2nd constituency from 1999 to 2002, replacing Dominique Gillot, who accepted an appointment as health minister.

Pernot supported the 2017 campaign of presidential candidate Emmanuel Macron.

References

1947 births
Living people
Deputies of the 11th National Assembly of the French Fifth Republic
Mayors of places in Île-de-France
Socialist Party (France) politicians
Citizen and Republican Movement politicians
Politicians from Île-de-France
People from Clichy-sous-Bois